{{DISPLAYTITLE:C5H7N3O2}}
The molecular formula C5H7N3O2 (molar mass: 141.13 g/mol, exact mass: 141.0538 u) may refer to:

 dimetridazole
 5-Hydroxymethylcytosine (5hmC)